A by-election for the Australian House of Representatives seat of Dalley was triggered by the death, on 2 April 1915, of Labor MP Robert Howe. However, by the close of nominations on 6 May only one candidate, Labor's William Mahony, had nominated, and he was thus declared elected unopposed.

Results

See also
Electoral results for the Division of Dalley
List of Australian federal by-elections

References

1915 elections in Australia
New South Wales federal by-elections
1910s in New South Wales
Unopposed by-elections